The 1927 Detroit Tigers season was a season in American baseball. It involved the Detroit Tigers attempting to win the American League, and they finished in fourth place.

Outfielder Harry Heilmann won his fourth American League batting title with a .398 batting average.

Offseason 
 January 15, 1927: Otto Miller, Billy Mullen, Frank O'Rourke and Lefty Stewart were traded by the Tigers to the St. Louis Browns for Pinky Hargrave, Marty McManus and Bobby LaMotte.
 January 27, 1927: Ty Cobb was released by the Tigers.

Regular season 
 May 31, 1927: Johnny Neun of the Tigers executed an unassisted triple play. Neun caught a line drive, tagged the runner off first base and tagged second base before the other runner returned.

Season standings

Record vs. opponents

Roster

Player stats

Batting

Starters by position 
Note: Pos = Position; G = Games played; AB = At bats; H = Hits; Avg. = Batting average; HR = Home runs; RBI = Runs batted in

Other batters 
Note: G = Games played; AB = At bats; H = Hits; Avg. = Batting average; HR = Home runs; RBI = Runs batted in

Pitching

Starting pitchers 
Note: G = Games pitched; IP = Innings pitched; W = Wins; L = Losses; ERA = Earned run average; SO = Strikeouts

Other pitchers 
Note: G = Games pitched; IP = Innings pitched; W = Wins; L = Losses; ERA = Earned run average; SO = Strikeouts

Relief pitchers 
Note: G = Games pitched; W = Wins; L = Losses; SV = Saves; ERA = Earned run average; SO = Strikeouts

Farm system

Notes

External links 

1927 Detroit Tigers season at Baseball Reference

Detroit Tigers seasons
Detroit Tigers season
Detroit Tigers
1927 in Detroit